Max Lucks (born 19 April 1997) is a German politician of Alliance 90/The Greens who has been serving as a member of the Bundestag in the 20th Bundestag that has been elected in the German federal election on 26 September 2021.

Political career

Early beginnings
Lucks joined the Green Party in 2013. From 2017 to 2019, he served as co-chair of the Green Youth, alongside Ricarda Lang.

Member of the German Parliament, 2021–present
In the Bundestag, Lucks serves on the Committee on Foreign Affairs, the Committee on Human Rights and Humanitarian Aid and the Subcommittee on Disarmament, Arms Control and Non-Proliferation.

In addition to his committee assignments, Lucks has been a member of the German delegation to the Parliamentary Assembly of the Council of Europe (PACE) since 2022. In the Assembly, he serves on the Committee on Political Affairs and Democracy and on its Subcommittee on Middle East Affairs . He is also the chairman of the German-Turkish Parliamentary Friendship Group and a member of the German-Mexican Parliamentary Friendship Group.

Other activities
 German Foundation for World Population (DSW), Member of the Parliamentary Advisory Board (since 2022)
 Bundesstiftung Magnus Hirschfeld (Magnus Hirschfeld Foundation), Member of th Board of Trustees (since 2022)
 German United Services Trade Union (ver.di), Member

Controversy
Along with Volker Beck, Terry Reintke and Felix Banaszak, Lucks was temporarily detained when Beck wanted to speak publicly at Gay Pride Istanbul in June 2016. Lucks outed himself as gay.

References

External links 
 

Living people
1997 births
People from Gelsenkirchen
21st-century German politicians
Members of the Bundestag for Alliance 90/The Greens
Members of the Bundestag 2021–2025
LGBT members of the Bundestag
German LGBT politicians
Gay politicians